István Gőri (born 4 June 1938) is a Hungarian racewalker. He competed in the men's 20 kilometres walk at the 1964 Summer Olympics.

References

External links
 
 
 
 

1938 births
Living people
Athletes (track and field) at the 1964 Summer Olympics
Hungarian male racewalkers
Olympic athletes of Hungary
Place of birth missing (living people)